A BatDiv or BATDIV was a standard U.S. Navy abbreviation or acronym for "battleship division." The Commander of a Battleship Division was known, in official Navy communications, as COMBATDIV (followed by a number), such as COMBATDIV ONE.

World War I and prior
BatDivs existed from at least 1913, when there were four Battleship Divisions in the US Atlantic Fleet.

By April 1917, with the American entry into World War I, there were at least nine Battleship Divisions, as BatDiv 9 was dispatched to operate with the Royal Navy's Grand Fleet.

Inter-War period
Before the Second World War, the U.S. Navy battleship force was organized into five Battleship Divisions of three battleships each.

Battleship Division 1

Battleship Division 2

Battleship Division 3

Battleship Division 4

Battleship Division 5

Stationed at Pearl Harbor as part of the U.S. Pacific Fleet were three battleship divisions; BatDiv 1, 2 and 4. These nine battleships were intended to counterbalance the ten capital ships of the Imperial Japanese Navy.

The U.S. Atlantic Fleet contained BatDiv 3 and 5. BatDiv3 had been part of the Pacific Fleet until 20 May 1941 when its three ships were transferred to the Atlantic Fleet for Neutrality Patrol duty. BatDiv 5 was a training division consisting of three older battleships.

World War II and beyond
After the Pearl Harbor attack, the BATDIV was replaced by the Task Group (TG) as the operational wartime unit. However, the BATDIV remained the administrative unit for purposes of personnel, training, maintenance and the like. Moreover, a Battleship Division could function in the operational chain of command, for example at the Battle of Surigao Strait, where BATDIV FOUR (Maryland, Mississippi and West Virginia) and BATDIV TWO (Pennsylvania, Tennessee and California) operated as units under BATFOR (Battleship Force) SEVENTH FLEET; Commander, Battle Force (COMBATFOR) Rear Admiral Oldendorf, was overall commander of the Surigao force (Task Group 77.2).

Battleship Division 1 was active in the Pacific at least until 1946, according to U.S. Navy records with the National Archives and Records Administration. On June 7, 1954, under the direction of Battleship Division 2, Norfolk, Virginia, the four battleships of the  operated together for the only time under the flag of RAdm George R. Cooper.

On January 15, 1957,  reported to Commander Fleet Training Group, Guantanano Bay, Cuba and Rear Admiral Henry Crommelin, Commander Battleship Division Two broke his flag in Wisconsin. On May 27, 1957 Rear Admiral Lewis S. Parks relieved Rear Admiral Crommelin as Commander Battleship Division Two.

See also 
United States Battleship Division Nine
ComBatPac, Commander, Battleships, U.S. Pacific Fleet
Carrier battle group#Battleship battle group

References

BatDiv
Seagoing divisions of the United States Navy